The Chambersburg Area School District is a public school district located in Franklin County, Pennsylvania. The district encompasses approximately 250 square miles, including the borough of Chambersburg, plus the townships of Hamilton, Greene, Lurgan, and Letterkenny, and a portion of Guilford Township. It operates the following schools: Andrew Buchanan Elementary, Guilford Hills Elementary,  South Hamilton Elementary, Benjamin Chambers Elementary, Hamilton Heights Elementary, Thaddeus Stevens Elementary, Lurgan Elementary, Falling Spring Elementary, Grandview Elementary, Scotland Elementary, Marion Elementary, Fayetteville Elementary, New Franklin Elementary, Chambersburg Area Middle School South, Chambersburg Area Middle School North, Chambersburg Area Senior High School and the Chambersburg CareerTech Career Magnet School.  In 2009, the US Census Bureau reported that the district' serves a resident population of 56,283 residents had a per capita incomes of $20,572, while the districts' median family income was $47,354 a year.

Extracurriculars
The Chambersburg Area School District offers a variety of clubs, activities and sport.

Sports
The District funds:

Boys
Baseball - AAAA
Basketball- AAAA
Cross Country - AAA
Football - AAAA
Golf - AAA
Lacrosse - AAAA
Soccer - AAA
Swimming and Diving - AAA
Tennis - AAA
Track and Field - AAA
Volleyball - AAA
 Wrestling - AAA

Girls
Basketball - AAAA
Cross Country - AAA
Field Hockey - AAA
Golf - AAA
Gymnastics - AAAA
Soccer (Fall) - AAA
Softball - AAA
Swimming and Diving - AAA
Girls' Tennis - AAA
Track and Field - AAA
Volleyball - AAA
Lacrosse  - AAA

Middle School Sports:

Boys
Basketball
Cross Country
Football
Soccer
Track and Field
Wrestling	

Girls
Basketball
Cross Country
Field Hockey
Soccer (Fall)
Track and Field
Volleyball

According to PIAA directory July 2012

References

School districts in Franklin County, Pennsylvania